The Church of Boris and Gleb is a church built in 1152, on the orders of Prince Yuri Dolgoruky, in Kideksha on the Nerl River, "where the encampment of Saint Boris had been".  It was probably part of the princely (wooden) palace complex, but was only used by Dolgorukii for a few years before he left to become Grand Prince of Kiev in 1155. The village, four kilometers east of Suzdal, was an important town before it was destroyed by the Mongols and declined in stature.

The church, built in limestone probably by architects from Galicia, is a four-piered, three-apse church. It is one of the oldest in the district and one of the few churches built by Dolgorukii that is still extant. It retains fragments of frescoes dating back to the twelfth century.  In the medieval period it was the site of a monastery and was then a parish church.  The building has been significantly altered over the centuries.  It lost its original vaulting and dome (the current roof and small dome date to the seventeenth century) and the apses are thought to be half their original height (their tops too were lost with the roof); a porch was added in the nineteenth century.  

The church is a part of a UNESCO World Heritage Site "White Monuments of Vladimir and Suzdal" along with the seven other medieval monuments located in Vladimir and its surroundings (The Vladimir-Suzdal Museum-Preserve), and belongs to the monuments of the Golden Ring of Russia.

The church, along with other structures built around it in later centuries - namely the St. Stephen's Church and bell-tower) appears on a three-ruble silver commemorative coin struck by the St. Petersburg Mint in 2002.

References 

  

Boris
Churches completed in 1152
12th-century Eastern Orthodox church buildings
12th-century churches in Russia
White Monuments of Vladimir and Suzdal
Cultural heritage monuments of federal significance in Vladimir Oblast